Aitor Paredes Casamichana (born 29 April 2000) is a Spanish professional footballer who plays for Athletic Bilbao as a central defender.

Club career
Born in Bilbao, Biscay, Basque Country, Paredes joined Athletic Bilbao's youth setup in 2010, from Etorkisun Alea GE. He made his senior debut with the farm team during the 2018–19 season, in Tercera División.

Paredes made his debut with the reserves on 6 December 2019, starting in a 0–1 Segunda División B away loss against SD Leioa. Definitely promoted to the B-side in June 2020, he subsequently became a regular starter for the team, playing in 18 matches (play-offs included) of the 2020–21 campaign, scoring once in a 3–0 home success over Barakaldo CF on 3 January 2021.

On 26 May 2021, Paredes renewed his contract with the Lions until 2025. He made his first team – and La Liga – debut on 29 August 2022, coming on as a late substitute for Iñigo Lekue in a 4–0 away routing of Cádiz CF.

References

External links
 
 
 
 
 

2000 births
Living people
Footballers from Bilbao
Spanish footballers
Association football defenders
La Liga players
Primera Federación players
Segunda División B players
Tercera División players
CD Basconia footballers
Bilbao Athletic footballers
Athletic Bilbao footballers
Spain youth international footballers